Thomas Hayley was the Dean of Chichester from 1735 to 1739.

He was from Cleobury and matriculated from All Souls College in 1698. A Prebendary of Chichester from 1705 to 1735 he was Rector of Dry Drayton from 1718 to 1724; then Vicar of Amport, Hampshire. He died on 12 August 1739.

References

Clergy from Shropshire
Alumni of All Souls College, Oxford
Deans of Chichester
1739 deaths
Year of birth unknown
People from Dry Drayton
People from Test Valley